Arthur Minson (born October 29, 1970) is an American businessman. He is president and chief operating officer (COO) of Leaflink, and a former co-CEO (with Sebastian Gunningham) of WeWork.

Minson was born and raised in New York City, is a graduate of Regis High School there, and is now on the school's board of trustees.

Minson earned a bachelor's degree from Georgetown University, and an MBA from Columbia Business School.

From 2009 to April 2013, Minson worked for AOL.

In June 2015 WeWork announced that Minson, former chief financial officer of Time Warner Cable, would join as president and chief operating officer.

In September 2019, it was announced that Adam Neumann was leaving as CEO and would be replaced by Minson and Sebastian Gunningham as co-CEOs. Minson and Gunningham were replaced by Sandeep Mathrani in February 2020.

References

Living people
WeWork people
American chief executives
Georgetown University alumni
Columbia Business School alumni
AOL people
Warner Bros. Discovery people
1970s births
Businesspeople from New York City
Regis High School (New York City) alumni
21st-century American businesspeople